Pepijn Bijsterbosch (born 3 November 1989) is a Dutch motorcycle racer. He currently competes in the IDM Superbike Championship aboard a BMW S1000R.

Career statistics

Grand Prix motorcycle racing

By season

Races by year
(key)

Supersport World Championship

Races by year
(key)

External links
 Profile on MotoGP.com
 Profile on WorldSBK.com

1989 births
Dutch motorcycle racers
Living people
125cc World Championship riders
Supersport World Championship riders
21st-century Dutch people